Nasirabad-e Galeh (also Romanized as Naşīrābād-e Galeh) is a village in Mizdej-e Olya Rural District, in the Central District of Farsan County, Chaharmahal and Bakhtiari Province, Iran. At the 2006 census, its population was 24, in 4 families. The village is populated by Lurs.

References 

Populated places in Farsan County
Luri settlements in Chaharmahal and Bakhtiari Province